Subhash Prasad Yadav (born 27 March 1967) is an Indian politician belonging to Rashtriya Janata Dal (RJD) from Gopalganj in Bihar. He was a Member of Parliament representing Bihar in the Rajya Sabha, the upper house from 2004 to 2010.

Subhash Yadav is the real brother of Prabhunath Yadav, Sadhu Yadav and Rabri Devi. His sister Rabri is married to Lalu Prasad Yadav, former Railway Minister of India and former Chief Minister of Bihar.

Early life 
Subhash Prasad Yadav was born on 27 March 1967 in Salar Kalan village near Mirganj of Gopalganj district, Bihar. His parents are Shiv Prasad Chaudhary and Maharjia Devi. 

He matriculated from Mukti Adarsh High School (BSEB) in 1986, and passed the intermediate examination in Arts from Gopalganj College (University of Bihar) in 1989 and later graduated with a BA from R.P.S College Patna (Magadh University) in 1993.

Family

Subhash Prasad Yadav has 2 brothers Sadhu Yadav and Prabhunath Yadav, and 4 sisters Rabri Devi, Jalebi, Rasgulla and Paan.

Personal life 
Subhash Yadav married Renu Yadav on 27 February 1987 and the couple has 2 sons Randhir and Saurav, and 2 daughters Ekta and Alka.

Political Career 
Subhash Prasad Yadav was a clerk in the Patna secretariat and when his sister Rabri Devi became the chief minister of Bihar, he quit his job and joined RJD to support his sister in July 1997. He started working as a member of RJD party and became the Member of Parliament (MP) in Rajya Sabha (upper house) as a representative of Bihar in 2004. 

Subhash Yadav supported Ramanand Yadav, a former Bharatiya Janata Party (BJP) candidate from Danapur, and got him elected with a margin of 55,000 votes on the RJD ticket in the 2002 by-election.

See also
 List of Rajya Sabha members from Bihar

References

External links
 Bihari Politicians
 लोकतंत्र का सिपाही के. जे. राव
 Externments violation of constitutional rights: Lalu
 Revolt in Bihar first family
 Subhash rebels against Lalu

1967 births
Living people
Members of the Bihar Legislative Council
People from Bihar
Rashtriya Janata Dal politicians
Rajya Sabha members from Bihar
Yadav family of Bihar